Vy Russell (born Violet Donnelly) was an American screenwriter, producer, and TV writer who worked primarily in the science-fiction genre during the 1950s and 1960s. A native Texan, she was married to cinematographer John L. Russell of Wisberg-Pollexfen Productions.

Selected filmography 

 Monstrosity (1963)
 Indestructible Man (1956)
 The Gene Autry Show (TV) (1951; one episode)

References 

American women screenwriters
1915 births
1998 deaths
20th-century American women writers
20th-century American screenwriters